Good Hearted Woman is an album by American country music artist Waylon Jennings, released in 1972 on RCA Nashville.

Background
Along with Ladies Love Outlaws, released later in 1972, and Lonesome, On'ry and Mean (released early the following year), Good Hearted Woman was responsible for transforming Jennings' image into that of one of the representatives of the outlaw country movement.  The LP contains a slew of songs written by like-minded songwriters such as Willie Nelson, Tony Joe White and Kris Kristofferson, whose compositions were pushing the boundaries of the conservative country music establishment.  Jennings, who had been frustrated by the assembly line production at RCA for years, became a leading force in what was being called "progressive country" music.  In the audio version of his autobiography Waylon, the singer recalls his frustration:  "I would think of ideas and before I got a chance to put 'em down - or even hear if they even worked - they'd tell me I was wrong.  I'd say, 'What the fuck ya mean, it's wrong?'  'Well, it'll make the record skip, if we put that big drum beat on it.  We don't understand that rhythm.  We have to smooth it out or we'll never get played on radio.'  And the best one was, 'That's not country.'  I always hated labels, and they kept trying to stick one on me."

Recording and composition
Good Hearted Woman was produced by Ronny Light, who was appointed by Chet Atkins to produce Waylon after Danny Davis left to work with his brass ensemble.  In his autobiography, Jennings, who had developed a chip on his shoulder regarding producers, admitted to badgering the young producer during the sessions: "Ronny was young, one of the nicest people in the world, and didn't deserve the misery I put him through.  I got more freedom with him as a producer, although I was still using musicians who didn't know what I was about."

The album's most famous song is the title track, which has since become a country classic. In 1969, while staying at the Fort Worther Motel in Fort Worth, Texas, Jennings was inspired to start writing the song when he saw advertising on a newspaper promoting Tina Turner as a "good hearted woman loving a two-timing man", a reference to Ike Turner. Jennings went to talk to Willie Nelson, who was in a middle of a poker game, and told Nelson about his idea.  While they kept playing, they expanded the lyrics as Nelson's wife Connie Koepke was writing them down. The extent of Nelson's contribution remains open to question, however.  In the authorized Jennings video biography Renegade Outlaw Legend, Nelson admits, "I think he had most of that song written.  We were in a poker game and he said, 'Hey, I'm writin' a song,' so we laid out of the poker game for a few hands.  I think I gave him a line or two and wound up with half the song."  In Michael Striessguth's book Outlaw: Waylon, Willie, Kris, and the Renegades of Nashville, Jennings guitarist Billy Ray Reynolds insists that Waylon approached him to work on the song around the same time but Reynolds refused, feeling that the song was finished:  "The next day or so, he got into a poker game and he did the same thing to Willie.  And Waylon even suggested the line that Willie is supposed to have written.  It was Waylon's line and Willie said, 'Hey, I like that.'  So Willie wound up with half the song and half the publishing.  I don't want to make Willie mad at me, but Waylon already had that song written."  It soared to #3 on the country singles chart, followed by "Sweet Dream Woman," which reached #7.  Jennings also recorded the Nelson composition "It Should Be Easier Now" and the metaphorical Kristofferson's tune "To Beat the Devil."  In 2013, author Michael Striessguth wrote that Jennings "painted the song with authenticity that could only come from a childhood in poverty and ten years of hard living on the road; indeed, it was one of the first times anybody could sit back and say, 'Waylon nailed that one.'"  Jennings also contributed "Do No Good Woman" to the album.

The original liner notes were written by Willie Nelson and describe the first time Jennings and Nelson met in Phoenix, Arizona.  The album was reissued in 1978 by RCA (AYL1-3737) with the same track listing, but different cover art.  Nelson's back cover liner notes were not included.

Reception
The album peaked at #7 on the Billboard country albums chart.  AllMusic: "In sum, Good Hearted Woman is a pretty sensational outing for Jennings; he's feeling his power here, and as the door opened just one more crack, the listener can hear how it never closed again."

Track listing
"Good Hearted Woman" (Waylon Jennings, Willie Nelson) – 3:00
"Same Old Lover Man" (Gordon Lightfoot) – 2:48
"One of My Bad Habits" (Harlan Howard) – 2:14
"Willie and Laura Mae Jones" (Tony Joe White) – 2:57
"It Should Be Easier Now" (Nelson) – 3:05
"Do No Good Woman" (Jennings) – 2:11
"Unsatisfied" (Shirl Milete) – 2:50
"I Knew You'd Be Leavin'" (Billy Ray Reynolds) – 2:43
"Sweet Dream Woman" (Chip Taylor, Al Gordoni) – 2:59
"To Beat the Devil" (Kris Kristofferson) – 4:04

References

Waylon Jennings albums
1972 albums
RCA Records albums